The Louvart River is a tributary of the south shore of the Lepallier River flowing into the municipality of Eeyou
Istchee Baie-James (municipality), in the administrative region of Nord-du-Québec, in Quebec, in Canada.

The course of the Louvart River is located southwest of James Bay Reserve.

This road is more or less parallel to the west side of the James Bay main road from Matagami and further north.

The surface of the Louvart River is usually frozen from early November to mid-May, however, safe ice circulation is generally from mid-November to mid-April.

Geography

Toponymy
The toponym Louvart River was formalized on December 5, 1968 at the Commission de toponymie du Québec, at the creation of this commission.

See also

References 

Rivers of Nord-du-Québec
Eeyou Istchee James Bay
Broadback River drainage basin